The following tables compare general and technical information for a number of cryptographic hash functions. See the individual functions' articles for further information. This article is not all-inclusive or necessarily up-to-date. An overview of hash function security/cryptanalysis can be found at hash function security summary.

General information 
Basic general information about the cryptographic hash functions: year, designer, references, etc.

Parameters

Notes

Compression function 
The following tables compare technical information for compression functions of cryptographic hash functions. The information comes from the specifications, please refer to them for more details.

Notes

See also 
 List of hash functions
 Hash function security summary
 Word (computer architecture)

References

External links 
 ECRYPT Benchmarking of Cryptographic Hashes – measurements of hash function speed on various platforms
 The ECRYPT Hash Function Website – A wiki for cryptographic hash functions
 SHA-3 Project – Information about SHA-3 competition

Cryptographic primitives
 
Hashing
Hash functions